Ravinia is a station on Metra's Union Pacific North Line. The station is located at 510 Roger Williams Avenue in Highland Park, Illinois. In Metra's zone-based fare structure, Ravinia is located in zone E. As of 2018, Ravinia is the 139th busiest of Metra's 236 non-downtown stations, with an average of 326 weekday boardings. Trains continue as far north as Kenosha, Wisconsin.

As of April 25, 2022, Ravinia is served by 23 inbound trains and 21 outbound trains on weekdays, by all 13 trains in both directions on Saturdays, and by all nine trains in each direction on Sundays.

Overview
The Ravinia station was opened in 1889 and includes a station house on the inbound platform which was designed by architect J.E. Blunt. Exterior work on the building, including the construction of a new roof and repainting, was completed in 2016.

The  station consists of two grade-level side platforms which serve the inbound and outbound tracks. Since the Union Pacific North Line operates on a left-hand main, the inbound platform is on the east side and the outbound is on the west. The station house is open from 5:00 A.M. to 1:00 A.M. There is no ticket agent at Ravinia, so tickets must be purchased on board the train. A parking lot is located on the east side of the station; on Ravinia Festival concert dates, a bus is available between the lot and Ravinia Park. The Green Bay Trail runs parallel to the Union Pacific North Line at Ravinia and is accessible from the station.

References

External links
Metra - Ravinia station
Station from Roger Williams Avenue from Google Maps Street View

Metra stations in Illinois
Former Chicago and North Western Railway stations
Highland Park, Illinois
Railway stations in Lake County, Illinois
Railway stations in the United States opened in 1889
Union Pacific North Line